Chattanooga Confederate order of battle may refer to:

 Wauhatchie Confederate order of battle
 Chattanooga-Ringgold Campaign Confederate order of battle